The 2017 Armagh Senior Football Championship is the 117th official edition of Armagh GAA's premier gaelic football competition for senior clubs and was won by Armagh Harps. The tournament consisted of 16 teams with the winner, Armagh Harps receiving the Gerry Fegan Cup and representing Armagh in the Ulster Senior Club Football Championship.

The championship has a backdoor format for the first two rounds where any team to lose two matches will be eliminated before proceeding to a knock-out format.

Maghery Seán McDermott's were the defending champions after they defeated St. Patrick's Cullyhanna in the 2016 final.

This was Cullaville Blues and Whitecross' return to the senior grade after they claimed the 2016 I.A.F.L. and I.F.C. titles respectively.

Wolfe Tones and Cullaville Blues are relegated to the I.F.C. and I.A.F.L. for 2018 after they finished 7th and 8th in the S.B.F.L. respectively. They will be replaced by the I.F.C. champions Killeavy St Moninna's as well as the I.A.F.L. champions Silverbridge Harps.

Changes from 2016 season

Promoted To S.F.C. from I.F.C. 

 Whitecross – (IFC Champions)
 Cullaville Blues – (IAFL Champions)

Relegated to I.F.C. from S.F.C. 
 Forkhill – (7th SBFL)
 Grange – (8th SBFL)

Rounds 1 to 3

Round 1 
All 16 teams play in this round. The 8 winners progress to Round 2A while the 8 losers progress to Round 2B.

 Ballymacnab 2-16, 1-9 Cullaville Blues, Silverbridge, 11/8/2017,
 Granemore 1-20, 2-11 Tír na nÓg, Maghery, 12/8/2017,
 Crossmaglen Rangers 0-17, 1-13 Whitecross, Cullyhanna, 12/8/2017,
 Armagh Harps 1-21, 0-9 Annaghmore, Pearse Óg Park, 12/8/2017,
 Maghery 1-19, 1-10 Madden, Abbey Park, 13/8/2017,
 Dromintee 2-20, 2-12 Sarsfields, Abbey Park, 13/8/2017,
 Cullyhanna 3-17, 1-10 Wolfe Tones, Athletic Grounds, 13/8/2017,
 Clann Éireann 2-12, 1-10 Pearse Óg's, Athletic Grounds, 13/8/2017,

Round 2

Round 2A 
The 8 winners from Round 1 enter this round. The 4 winners enter the draw for the quarter finals while the 4 losers play in Round 3.

Round 2B 
The 8 losers from Round 1 enter this round. The 4 winners advance to Round 3 while the 4 losers exit the Championship.

 Annaghmore 2-15, 3-12 Sarsfields, Athletic Grounds, 25/8/2017,
 Whitecross 1-8, 0-10 Culloville Blues, Silverbridge, 25/8/2017,
 Wolfe Tones 3-14, 2-11 Pearse Óg's, Portadown, 26/8/2017,
 Madden 4-14, 2-8 Tír na nÓg, Granemore, 27/8/2017,

 Sarsfields 1-14, 0-13 Annaghmore, Davitt Park, 30/8/2017, (Replay)

Round 3 
The 4 losers from Round 2A (who won a match and lost a match) play the 4 winners from Round 2B (who lost a match and won a match). The 4 winners qualify for the quarter-finals.

Knock-Out Stage

Last Eight Draw

Quarter-finals 
The four winners from Round 2A play the four winners from Round 3. The 4 winners advance to the semi-finals.

Semi-finals

Final

Ulster Senior Club Football Championship

References 

Armagh Senior Football Championship
Armagh Senior Football Championship